Krasnostanovsky is a rural locality (a khutor) in Verkhnekardailskoye Rural Settlement, Novonikolayevsky District, Volgograd Oblast, Russia. The population was 9 as of 2010.

Geography 
Krasnostanovsky is located in steppe, on the Khopyorsko-Buzulukskaya Plain, on the right bank of the Kardail River, 37 km northeast of Novonikolayevsky (the district's administrative centre) by road. Nikolayevsky is the nearest rural locality.

References 

Rural localities in Novonikolayevsky District